Rory Jonathon Saper (born 3 April 1996) is an English actor. He is best known for his roles in the film Rufus (2012) and the series Find Me in Paris (2018–2020).

Early life
Saper was born in Slough to parents Camilla and Roger and grew up in Beaconsfield with his two older sisters. His father is a stage actor. He attended Davenies School and Harrow School.

Career
After making a number of short films with his friend and uploading them to YouTube, Saper was scouted at the age of fifteen to make his feature film debut as the titular character of the Canadian vampire film Rufus, which premiered in 2012. He was named Male Indie Icon at the 2013 Las Vegas Film Festival.

Saper finished school before going on to appear in more films in 2016 and 2017, including the British sports drama The Pass and as a young version of Alexander Skarsgård's Tarzan in The Legend of Tarzan. In 2018, Saper made his television debut as he began starring in the English-language tween fantasy series Find Me in Paris as Max Alvarez, a role he would play for the first two seasons. He appeared in the 2020 independent film Summerland. He has upcoming roles in the films Kindling and Influencer.

Filmography

Film

Television

Music videos

Awards and nominations

References

External links
 
 Rory J Saper at Curtis Brown

Living people
1996 births
Male actors from Buckinghamshire
People educated at Harrow School
People from Beaconsfield
People from Slough